The 2014 Copa Libertadores de Futsal was the 14th edition of South America's premier club futsal tournament.

South Zone

Group A

Group B

Knockout phase

North Zone
The tournament was not played in the North Zone. Consequently the South Zone tournament proclaimed Champion and Runner on a continental level.

External links
 Official CONMEBOL website

Copa Libertadores de Futsal
Copa Libertadores de Futsal
Copa Libertadores de Futsal